20th Century Women is a 2016 American coming-of-age comedy-drama film written and directed by Mike Mills and starring Annette Bening, Elle Fanning, Greta Gerwig, Lucas Jade Zumann, and Billy Crudup. It is set in 1979 in Southern California and partly inspired by Mills' childhood.

The film was produced by Annapurna Pictures in 2015. It had its world premiere at the New York Film Festival on October 8, 2016, and was theatrically released by A24 on December 28. Critics responded favorably to the film, and it was nominated for Best Motion Picture – Musical or Comedy and Best Actress (Bening) at the 74th Golden Globe Awards, as well as Best Original Screenplay at the 89th Academy Awards.

Plot
In 1979, 15-year-old Jamie Fields lives in Santa Barbara with his 55-year-old single mother, Dorothea, and their two tenants: Abbie Porter, a 24-year-old photographer being treated for cervical cancer, and William, a carpenter and mechanic. Jamie's best friend is 17-year-old Julie Hamlin, who often spends the night with Jamie, but chooses not to have sex with him because she believes it would destroy their friendship.

Concerned she is having trouble connecting with her son, Dorothea asks Abbie and Julie to help raise him, but Jamie responds to this news by running away to Los Angeles with some friends to attend a rock concert. When he gets back, Julie tells him she had unprotected sex and is worried she will get pregnant. Jamie accompanies Abbie to a doctor's appointment, where she learns she is cancer-free, but will likely be unable to have children, and he reads a magazine article about home pregnancy tests. He buys one for Julie, and it comes back negative. To thank Jamie for his support, Abbie makes him a mixtape, and she begins to confide in him, such as about how she moved back home from New York after her cancer diagnosis, but her mother could not handle the fact that the cancer was caused by her use of DES, a fertility drug, while Abbie was in utero, so Abbie moved in with Dorothea.

One day, after seeing Julie sneak out Jamie’s window, Dorothea talks with her, and they end up discussing the fact that Dorothea has not had any real relationships since Jamie’s father left years earlier. Dorothea asks Abbie to show her "the modern world," so they go to a punk club, where William kisses Dorothea, but she rejects him due to his sexual relationship with Abbie. After Dorothea leaves, Abbie gets in a fight and William tells her he no longer wants to sleep with her. Abbie goes to talk to Jamie and, finding him in bed with Julie, says Julie is disempowering Jamie and tells the teens to not get stuck in Santa Barbara.

Later, Jamie asks Abbie to take him to the club, and he gets drunk and kisses a woman. Meanwhile, Dorothea teaches William how to pursue a relationship, as opposed to a one night stand. When Abbie tells Dorothea about Jaime's night, Dorothea is not upset, though she is wistful that, as his mother, she can never see what Jamie is like out in the world.

Abbie lends Jamie some books about feminism, and he finds them interesting, but Dorothea thinks they are too much for him and scolds Abbie. At a dinner party, Abbie says she is tired because she is menstruating, and, frustrated by the discomfort the word causes, she makes all of the men at the table say "menstruation". This inspires Julie to talk about her first period and her first sexual encounter, which ends the gathering.

Jamie tells Julie he no longer wants her to spend the night if she just wants to talk. Hurt, she suggests they take a road trip up the coast. At a hotel, Jamie says he loves Julie, but she says they are too close to have sex. They argue, and Julie accuses Jaime of being like "the other guys", so Jamie storms off. Julia calls Dorothea, but by the time she, Abbie, and William arrive, Jamie has returned. Dorothea tells Jamie that she asked Abbie and Julie for help because she wants Jaime to be happier than she is, and he says he thought they were doing fine already. The two make up and return to Santa Barbara on their own, and Dorothea talks openly about her feelings and dreams for the first time.

An epilogue reveals that Julie will go on the pill, attend NYU, lose touch with Jamie and Dorothea, fall in love, move to Paris, and choose to never have children. Abbie will stay in Santa Barbara, get married, set up a photography studio in her garage, and successfully give birth to two sons. William will live with Dorothea for another year, move to Sedona, open a pottery store, get married, get divorced, and remarry. Dorothea will meet a man in 1983 and stay with him until her death from metastatic lung cancer in 1999. Years after Dorothea's death, Jamie will get married and have a son, to whom he will try, unsuccessfully, to describe Dorothea.

Cast

Production

Development
While the character of Jamie reflects his own experiences, the characters of Dorothea and Abbie were inspired by Mills' mother and older sister, respectively, and he wrote the character of Julie based on the experiences of several of his friends. He said: "It felt like I was raised by my mom and sisters, so I was always appealing to women in the punk scene or women in my world. I always leaned to them to figure out my life as a straight white guy. So I wanted to make a movie about that." Mills has described the film as a "loveletter" to the women who raised him, and, although it is autobiographical, he also noted that it is fictionalized, explaining: "With all these characters, what guides me is the real person. Of course, I'm cinematizing real people, and you can never get them right or show all of their dimensions, but that's very much what my mom was like." After finishing the script, Mills brought it to Annapurna Pictures, who, liking Mills's previous film Beginners, agreed to produce 20th Century Women.

Casting
In May 2015, Annette Bening, Greta Gerwig, and Elle Fanning joined the cast, with Bening set to play a single mother, Gerwig a young sophisticated photographer, and Fanning a provocative friend of the single mother's teenage son. On August 3, 2015, Billy Crudup was cast in a supporting role.

While preparing for her role in the film, Bening watched films Mills' mother loved and had extensive talks with Mills about his mom. Gerwig prepared for her role by taking photography lessons, learning how to use a camera, listening to records, reading books, and watching films, and she also spoke with Mills' sister, whom her character is based upon. Fanning was given The Road Less Traveled by M. Scott Peck to help her prepare.

Filming
Principal photography on the film began on September 8, 2015, in Southern California, and concluded on October 27, 2015. The film was shot over 35 days, mainly in Los Angeles, with exteriors shot in Santa Barbara. At one point, a stray tuxedo cat wandered onto the set, and Mills decided to include him in some scenes in the film.

Music
Roger Neill composed the film's score, and the following songs are featured in the film:

 "Don't Worry About the Government" – Talking Heads
 "(White Man) In Hammersmith Palais" – The Clash
 "This Heart of Mine" – Fred Astaire
 "In a Sentimental Mood" – Benny Goodman and His Orchestra
 "Fairytale in the Supermarket" – The Raincoats
 "As Time Goes By" – Rudy Vallee
 "I've Had It" – Black Flag
 "Media Blitz" – The Germs
 "Drugs" – Talking Heads
 "Chant D'Amour" – Lars Clutterham
 "Love in a Void" – Siouxsie and the Banshees
 "Basin Street Blues" – Louis Armstrong and His Hot Five
 "Cheree" – Suicide
 "Gut Feeling / (Slap Your Mammy)" – Devo
 "Vag Punch" – Phlask
 "D.J." – David Bowie
 "Lila Engel (Lilac Angel)" – Neu!
 "The Big Country" – Talking Heads
 "So Blue Love" – Brick Fleagle
 "Nervous Breakdown" – Black Flag
 "After Hours on Dream Street" – Sandy Williams
 "Why Can't I Touch It" – Buzzcocks

Release
In June 2016, A24 acquired the U.S. distribution rights to the film. It had its world premiere on October 8, 2016, as the Centerpiece film of the New York Film Festival, and it was screened at AFI Fest on November 16. The film's limited release was scheduled to begin on December 25, but it was pushed back to December 28.

Reception

Box office
20th Century Women entered wide release in the United States on January 20, 2017. It grossed $1,385,336 that weekend, ranking 17th at the box office. The film went on to earn a total of $5,664,764 domestically and $1,550,042 in international markets, for a worldwide box office total of $7,214,806.

Critical response
On review aggregator website Rotten Tomatoes, the film has an approval rating of 88% based on 229 reviews, with an average score of 7.8/10; the site's "critics consensus" reads: "20th Century Women offers Annette Bening a too-rare opportunity to shine in a leading role – and marks another assured step forward for writer-director Mike Mills." On Metacritic, the film has a weighted average score of 83 out of 100 based on 40 critics, indicating "universal acclaim".

Owen Gleiberman of Variety gave the film a positive review, writing: "The best thing about the movie is Bening's performance as Dorothea Fields, who's portrayed as a very particular kind of contradictory free spirit. Divorced and proud, with a lot of heart and soul but even more over-sharing flakiness". David Rooney of The Hollywood Reporter also gave the film a positive review, writing: "Mills uses some of the same devices as Beginners to illuminate his characters' cultural formation, notably historic montages of their birth years or backgrounds prior to coming together. And he also glances ahead to their future lives, after the arc of the movie. But the quilting is more seamless here because the eccentricities are so integral to the writing and performances."

The Writers Guild Foundation listed the script as one of the best of the 2010s, describing the film as "an excellent study in character development. The script uses narrated flashbacks to tell each main character's unique story, bringing us further into their world and allowing us to care more deeply about them. This different take on exposition makes us think about how we hold onto key facts and images that we know about certain people".

Accolades

References

External links

 
 
 
 
 
 Official screenplay

2016 films
2016 comedy-drama films
2010s coming-of-age comedy-drama films
2010s English-language films
2010s feminist films
A24 (company) films
American coming-of-age comedy-drama films
American feminist comedy films
Annapurna Pictures films
Films about mother–son relationships
Films about parenting
Films about puberty
Films directed by Mike Mills
Films produced by Anne Carey
Films produced by Megan Ellison
Films set in 1979
Films set in Santa Barbara, California
Films shot in California
2010s American films
2016 independent films